Andy Musayev (born 17 April 2003) is a Belgian professional footballer who plays as a forward for Oostende.

Professional career
Musayev is a youth product of VG Oostende, Oostende, and Club Brugge. On 13 July 2022, he signed his first professional contract with Oostende until 2025. He made his professional debut with them as a late substitute in a 2–0 Belgian First Division A loss to Anderlecht on 24 July 2022.

Personal life
Musayev was born in Belgium to Chechen parents who emigrated from Russia to Belgium in the 90s during the Second Chechen War. He is a muslim, and visited Chechnya often as a youth.

References

External links
 

2003 births
Living people
Sportspeople from Ostend
Belgian footballers
Belgian people of Chechen descent
Belgian people of Russian descent
Association football forwards
K.V. Oostende players
Belgian Pro League players